Meladrazine is a drug used in urology as an antispasmodic.

References

Hydrazines
Muscarinic antagonists
Triazines
Diethylamino compounds